The Hartley–Melvin–Sanborn High School is a rural public high school located in Hartley, Iowa.  It is part of the Hartley–Melvin–Sanborn Community School District. The school's mascot is the Hawk and athletic competitions take place in the War Eagle Conference.

Athletics
The Hawks compete in the following sports in the War Eagle Conference:
Cross country
Volleyball
Football
Basketball
Wrestling
Track and field
Golf 
Baseball
Softball

See also
List of high schools in Iowa

References

External links
Hartley–Melvin–Sanborn Community School District website

Public high schools in Iowa
Schools in O'Brien County, Iowa